Christoforos Kourtis (born November 5, 1996) is a Cypriot footballer who currently plays for Anagennisi Deryneia as a midfielder.

References

External links
 

1996 births
Living people
Cypriot footballers
AEK Larnaca FC players
ASIL Lysi players
Anagennisi Deryneia FC players
Cypriot First Division players
Cypriot Second Division players
Association football midfielders
Greek Cypriot people